Wimbledon is a constituency represented in the House of Commons of the UK Parliament. Since 2005, the seat has been represented by Stephen Hammond of the Conservatives.

History
The area was created by the Redistribution of Seats Act 1885 and had lay in Mid Surrey that elected two MPs. The constituency covered great bounds, skirting around Croydon to its south to reach Caterham, Warlingham, Chelsham and Farleigh in the North Downs and bearing formal alternate titles of the Wimbledon Division (of Surrey) and the North East Division of Surrey which in all but the most formal legal writing was written as North East Surrey.

An Act reduced the seat in 1918 to create the Mitcham seat in the south-east; another in 1950 created Merton and Morden in the south.

Political history
Since 1885 the seat has elected Conservative MPs except from 1945 to 1950 and 1997–2005, when the Labour candidate won the seat during that party's national landslide years. While the 2005 Conservative majority was marginal, the 2010 majority was 24.1% of the vote, so on the percentage of majority measure, but not on the longevity measure, it bore a safe seat hallmark.

In elections to the London Borough of Merton, the seat returns all of the council's Conservative and Liberal Democrat councillors. Since 1990 the ward of Merton Park has only ever returned councillors for Merton Park Ward Residents Association. Since 1994 the ward of West Barnes, which contains Merton's half of the town of Motspur Park, has swung between the Conservatives and the Liberal Democrats; the latter presently hold all three seats in the ward. In the local elections in 2018, Liberal Democrat councillors were elected for the wards of Trinity and Dundonald for the first time in the borough's history, with a further first time win for the Liberal Democrats in a by-election in the Cannon Hill ward in 2019.

In 2010, the second-placed candidate was a Liberal Democrat. The national collapse in the Liberal Democrat vote at the 2015 election meant that the Liberal Democrats did not return to 2nd place until 2019, when they did so with a 22.7% upswing in their vote. The seat is now one of the most marginal in the country and a top Liberal Democrat target and Conservative defence for the next general election.

In the 2016 referendum on the UK's membership of the European Union, the London Borough of Merton, of which the constituency is a part, voted to remain by 62.9%, and 70.6% of this constituency itself voted to remain in the European Union. In September 2019 the incumbent, Stephen Hammond lost his party's whip for rebelling on a key Brexit vote. He briefly sat as an Independent and the whip was restored on 29 October 2019, with 9 of 21 other rebels of the same party.

Prominent frontbenchers
Henry Chaplin was sworn of the Privy Council in 1885 when he was Chancellor of the Duchy of Lancaster until 1886. He became the first President of the Board of Agriculture as part of the Cabinet (1889-1892). In the Conservative cabinet of 1895 to 1900 he was President of the Local Government Board and was responsible for the Agricultural Rates Act 1896
Sir Michael Havers reached the highest judicial and legal position in the country for four months in 1987, Lord High Chancellor of Great Britain who also acted as Lord Speaker. For eight years previously, Havers was Attorney General for England, Wales and Northern Ireland, having served as the more junior, Solicitor General in the Heath ministry

Boundaries 

1885–1918: The Sessional Division of Croydon except so much as is within a district of the Metropolis, the parishes of Caterham, Chelsham, Farley, Warlingham, Merton, and Wimbledon, so much of the Parliamentary Borough of Deptford as is in Surrey, and the area of the Parliamentary Boroughs of Battersea and Clapham, Camberwell, Lambeth, Newington, Southwark, and Wandsworth.

1918–1950: The Municipal Borough of Wimbledon, and the Urban District of Merton and Morden.

1950–1955: The Municipal Boroughs of Wimbledon, and Malden and Coombe.

1955–1974: The Municipal Borough of Wimbledon.

1974–1983: The London Borough of Merton wards of Cannon Hill, Priory, West Barnes, Wimbledon East, Wimbledon North, Wimbledon South, and Wimbledon West.

1983–2010: The London Borough of Merton wards of Abbey, Cannon Hill, Dundonald, Durnsford, Hillside, Merton Park, Raynes Park, Trinity, Village, and West Barnes.

2010–present: As above less Durnsford ward and with Wimbledon Park ward added.

Constituency profile
The seat has a commuter-sustained suburban economy with an imposing shopping centre, overwhelmingly privately built and owned or rented homes and a range of open green spaces, ranging in value from elevated Wimbledon Village - sandwiched between Wimbledon Common and Wimbledon Park - where a large tranche of homes exceed £1,000,000 - to Merton Abbey ruins and South Wimbledon, with more social housing in its wards.

Wimbledon station is a southern terminus of the District line, as well as a station on the South West main line. It is also the western terminus of the Croydon Tramlink. South Wimbledon is a station on the Northern line branch to Morden.

Workless claimants who were registered jobseekers were in November 2012 significantly lower than the national average of 3.8%, at 1.5% of the population based on a statistical compilation by The Guardian.

Wards in this area often see a minority of Liberal Democrat and Labour councillors. Voters have quite high median and mean incomes, with an above-average public sector workforce which together means the seat resembles similar Tory-strong seats for London with other party traditions also followed: Richmond Park, Kingston and Surbiton and Putney.  As widely touted in opinion polls the runner-up of the 2019 election became the Liberal Democrat.

Members of Parliament

Election results

Elections in the 2010s

Elections in the 2000s

Elections in the 1990s

Elections in the 1980s

Elections in the 1970s

Elections in the 1960s

Elections in the 1950s

Substantial loss of territory to create Mitcham and Morden

Elections in the 1940s

Elections in the 1930s

Elections in the 1920s

Elections in the 1910s

Elections in the 1900s

Elections in the 1890s

Elections in the 1880s

See also 
 List of parliamentary constituencies in London

Notes

References

External links 
Politics Resources (Election results from 1922 onwards)
Electoral Calculus (Election results from 1955 onwards)

Further reading 

Parliamentary constituencies in London
Constituencies of the Parliament of the United Kingdom established in 1885
Politics of the London Borough of Merton
Wimbledon, London